This is a list of airports in the Northern Mariana Islands (a U.S. Commonwealth), grouped by type and sorted by location. It contains all public-use and military airports. Some private-use and former airports may be included where notable, such as airports that used to be public-use, those with commercial enplanements recorded by the Federal Aviation Administration (FAA) or airports assigned an International Air Transport Association (IATA) airport code.

Airports

This list contains the following information:

 Location - The village or other location generally associated with the airport.
 FAA - The location identifier assigned by the Federal Aviation Administration (FAA).
 IATA - The airport code assigned by the International Air Transport Association (IATA). Those that do not match the FAA code are shown in bold.
 ICAO - The location indicator assigned by the International Civil Aviation Organization (ICAO).
 Airport name - The official airport name. Those shown in bold indicate the airport has scheduled service on commercial airlines.
 Role - One of four FAA airport categories, as per the 2021-2025 National Plan of Integrated Airport Systems (NPIAS) Report and updated based on FAA Passenger Boarding Data:
 P: Commercial Service - Primary are publicly owned airports that receive scheduled passenger service and have more than 10,000 passenger boardings (enplanements) each year. Each primary airport is sub-classified by the FAA as one of the following four "hub" types:
 L: Large Hub that accounts for at least 1% of total U.S. passenger enplanements.
 M: Medium Hub that accounts for between 0.25% and 1% of total U.S. passenger enplanements.
 S: Small Hub that accounts for between 0.05% and 0.25% of total U.S. passenger enplanements.
 N: Non-Hub that accounts for less than 0.05% of total U.S. passenger enplanements, but more than 10,000 annual enplanements.
 CS: Commercial Service - Non-Primary are publicly owned airports that receive scheduled passenger service and have at least 2,500 passenger boardings each year.
 R: Reliever airports are designated by the FAA to relieve congestion at a large commercial service airport and to provide more general aviation access to the overall community.
 GA: General Aviation airports are the largest single group of airports in the U.S. airport system.
 Enpl. - The number of enplanements (commercial passenger boardings) that occurred at the airport in calendar year 2019, as per FAA records.

See also 
 List of airports by ICAO code: P#PG - Mariana Islands
 Wikipedia:WikiProject Aviation/Airline destination lists: Oceania#Northern Mariana Islands (United States)

References 
Federal Aviation Administration (FAA):
 FAA Airport Data (Form 5010) from National Flight Data Center (NFDC), also available from AirportIQ 5010
 National Plan of Integrated Airport Systems for 2017–2021, updated September 2016
 Passenger Boarding (Enplanement) Data for CY 2016, updated July 2017
 FAA Order JO 7350.8K - Location Identifiers, effective 29 July 2010

Regional:
 Commonwealth Ports Authority

International:
 
  - includes IATA codes

Other sites used as a reference when compiling and updating this list:
 Aviation Safety Network - used to check IATA airport codes
 Great Circle Mapper: Airports in the Northern Mariana Islands - used to check IATA and ICAO airport codes

 
Northern Mariana Islands
Northern Mariana Islands
Airports